Michael Henry Codd  (born 1939) is a retired Australian senior public servant and university chancellor.

Early life
Mike Codd was born in 1939. He attended University of Adelaide, graduating in 1961 with a Bachelor of Economics with honours.

Career
Codd was appointed to his first Secretary role in 1981, becoming head of the Department of Industrial Relations.

Between 1985 and 1986 Codd served as Secretary of the Department of Community Services.

In 1986 he was appointed Department of the Prime Minister and Cabinet Secretary. In 1987 he worked with Prime Minister Bob Hawke to introduce massive reform changes to the public service, creating "super ministry" departments. Codd did note potential disadvantages of the machinery of government changes, including that there was potential for "bunker mentality" to continue.

Codd retired from the public service in December 1991, his appointment was terminated by an Executive Council meeting on 27 December that year.

After his retirement from the Department of the Prime Minister and Cabinet, Codd joined consultancy firm Coopers and Lybrand. He was also appointed to the board of Qantas in 1992, prior to the airline's privatization, and served 16 years retiring in 2008. Between 1997 and 2009 he was Chancellor of the University of Wollongong (UOW), retiring in September 2009.

Awards and honours
In January 1991, Codd was made a Companion of the Order of Australia in recognition of service as secretary to the Department of Prime Minister and Cabinet. He received a Centenary Medal in 2001.

In 2009 UOW awarded Mike Codd an honorary degree and in 2010 named a building after him on its Innovation Campus in recognition of his eminent service as the university's second Chancellor. His portrait (by Mathew Lynn, 2014) hangs in the Codd building.

Notes

References and further reading

 (pages 157, 193–194, 202)

1939 births
Australian public servants
Chancellors of the University of Wollongong
Companions of the Order of Australia
Living people
Recipients of the Centenary Medal
University of Adelaide alumni